Bae or BAE may refer to:

Organisations 
 BAE Systems plc, a British defence, security and aerospace company
 British Aerospace (BAe), a predecessor of BAE Systems
 BAE Systems Inc., a wholly owned independent U.S. subsidiary of BAE Systems plc.
 Bureau of American Ethnology, an American anthropological research center and archive at the Smithsonian Institution
 BAE Batterien, a producer of lead acid batteries for industrial applications, headquartered in Germany
 Buenos Aires Económico, Argentine newspaper
 Black Arrow Express, a corporate division of the AAI_Group_of_Companies, a logistics company in the Philippines

Other uses 
 Bae (surname), a Korean family name
 Barcelonnette – Saint-Pons Airfield (IATA code: BAE), France
 Bae (word), a slang term of endearment, short for "baby" or "babe"
 Barawana language (ISO 639-3 code: bae), a nearly-extinct Arawakan language of Venezuela and Brazil
 Bay, Laguna, a municipality in the Philippines, often called Bae by its residents
 "Bae" (Marcus & Martinus song), a song by Marcus & Martinus
 "Bae Bae", a 2015 song recorded by South Korean boy band Big Bang
 Salt Bae, a nickname used by Nusret Gokce, a Turkish restaurant owner
 Bae, a female tribal leader (datu) among the Lumad people of the Philippines
Bronchial artery embolization

See also